Yuri Yulianovich Shevchuk (born 16 May 1957) is a Soviet and Russian rock musician and singer/songwriter who leads the rock band DDT, which he founded with Vladimir Sigachyov in 1980.

He is best known for his distinctive gravelly voice. His lyrics detail aspects of Russian life with a wry, humanistic sense of humor. He is also famous for opposing pop music culture (especially playback performances) for many years. He is often accredited with being the greatest songwriter in present-day Russia.

Biography

Shevchuk was born in Yagodnoye in Magadan Oblast and raised in Ufa, Bashkir ASSR. Prior to founding DDT, he worked as an art teacher.

By the time the group released their third album Periferiya (Periphery), Shevchuk was facing a lot of pressure from Soviet censorship. In 1985 he disbanded the group and together with his wife Elmira moved to St. Petersburg. There he assembled a new line-up and became a member of the Leningrad Rock Club. In 1989, DDT performed in Hungary; in 1990, in the US and for the first time in Japan.

In 1992, Shevchuk lost his wife to cancer. The album Aktrisa Vesna (Spring the Actress) was dedicated to her and featured her paintings.

In January 1995, during the First Chechen War, Shevchuk went on a peace mission to Chechnya, where he gave 50 concerts for Russian troops and Chechen citizens alike.

In 1999, Shevchuk visited Yugoslavia, giving concerts in support of the country's integrity and sharply criticizing the US for its bombings of the sovereign state. He also compiled photographic reports for UNESCO about destroyed Orthodox churches in the Serbian region of Kosovo.

In the 2000s, Shevchuk was highly critical of the nature of Vladimir Putin's Russia that he regarded as undemocratic  (see: Putinism), and was one of only few celebrities to voice oppositionist grievances to Putin's face during a now-famous sit-down with cultural figures. On 3 March 2008, Shevchuk participated in a Dissenters' March in Saint Petersburg against the presidential elections to which no serious opposition was admitted. One of his controversial songs, "Kogda zakonchitsya neft", features the lyrics "When the oil runs dry, our president will die".

On 24 and 26 September 2008, Shevchuk organized two peace concerts in Moscow and Saint Petersburg in protest against the Russian–Georgian war. The concerts were titled "Don't Shoot" ("Ne Strelyai"), after an eponymous song Shevchuk had written in 1980 in response to the Soviet–Afghan War. Together with DDT he performed alongside the Georgian jazz singer Nino Katamadze, the Ossetian band Iriston, and the band Bratya Karamazovy from Ukraine. Revenue from the concerts was shared with victims of the war, Ossetians as well as Georgians.

In May 2010, Shevchuk received considerable media attention following a pointed dialogue with Vladimir Putin on state television, in which the singer openly confronted the then-Prime Minister with questions on controversial topics of democracy, freedom of speech, freedom of assembly, and freedom of the press. In a 2017 interview, Shevchuk admitted that the day after the televised exchange he "got a call from United States Congress with an invitation to give some kind of lecture..." and that his answer was: "[we] will settle it among ourselves". He also stated that some of his requests were treated and processed by Kremlin administration.

On 25 August 2010, Shevchuk performed the Bob Dylan song "Knockin' on Heaven's Door" together with U2 at their first ever concert in Russia, at the Luzhniki Stadium in Moscow.

On 4 January 2011, Shevchuk was featured on the U.S. NPR Morning Edition radio program.

On 18 June 2014, during a concert at the Green Theatre in Moscow, Shevchuk declared that all revenue from the concert would be donated to the Dr. Lisa fund to aid injured citizens of Donbas.

Shevchuk has consistently opposed the 2022 Russian invasion of Ukraine since it began on 24 February, when he stated, "Our future is being taken from us. We’re being pulled as if through an ice hole into the past, into the 19th, 18th, 17th century. And people refuse to accept it."

In May 2022, Shevchuk was charged under the war censorship law after speaking out against Putin and the war in Ukraine at a concert in Ufa, declaring: “The motherland, my friends, is not the president’s ass that has to be slobbered and kissed all the time, the motherland is an impoverished old woman at the train station selling potatoes.” He also said that "people of Ukraine are being murdered" and "our boys are dying over there" due to "some Napoleonic plans of another Caesar of ours." The case was opened by Police Division №7 of Ufa and was sent to the court of Sovietsky district of Ufa, but had subsequently been referred to the court of Dzerzhinsky district of Saint Petersburg. The court then returned the case to the Police Division №7 of Ufa due to the lack of description of committed violation in the text of the police protocol. On 15 July 2022, the case came before the court of Dzerzhinsky district of Saint Petersburg again. On 18 July 2022, the court of Dzerzhinsky district of Saint Petersburg again returned the case due to the lack of signature of Yuri Shevchuk and of information that he was apprised of his rights in the text of the police protocol. Eventually, on 16 August 2022, the court of Sovietsky district of Ufa found Yuri Shevchuk guilty of discrediting Russian Armed Forces. The fact, that Shevchuk didn't use words "Russian Armed Forces" or similar in his speech at a concert, was not considered important by the court. Shevchuk appealed the judgement. In reaction to Shevchuk's statements, Moscow authorities forced the cancellation of a scheduled DDT 40th anniversary concert in the city.

Solo discography (without DDT)

Notes

External links

 Official website of DDT 
 About DDT - Lyrics and English translations
 
 Yuri Shevchuk at the Forbes
 Yuri Shevchuk on Discogs.com
Interview with Yuri Shevchuk in: OLENA CHEKAN – The Quest for a Free Ukraine - Bohdan Rodyuk Chekan (Ed.), DER KONTERFEI 015, Paperback, English, 96 pages, 2015, 

1957 births
20th-century Russian male singers
20th-century Russian singers
21st-century Russian male singers
21st-century Russian singers
Living people
People from Yagodninsky District
Russian rock singers
Russian people of Ukrainian descent
Russian people of Tatar descent
Russian anti-war activists
Russian male singer-songwriters
Russian record producers
Soviet male singer-songwriters
Russian activists against the 2022 Russian invasion of Ukraine